VOEA Ngahau Koula (P101) was the first ship of the Tongan Maritime Force. It was built in the United Kingdom, at Brooke Marine in Lowestoft, and was commissioned on 10 March 1973. The ship was one of several of the same aluminum-hulled class, which were used in ex-British colonies after they were granted independence. It was joined in 1976 by a sister ship, which incorporated several improvements to the design, most notable, the range was increased from 800 to 1000 miles.

In 1974, Ngahau Koula recorded Lt. Lupeti Vi as commanding officer.

References

1973 ships
Patrol boats
Naval ships of Tonga